Justin Haire is in American college baseball coach, currently serving as head coach of the Campbell Fighting Camels baseball team.  He has held that position since the 2015 season.  He was catcher at Bowling Green and Indianapolis prior to his coaching career.  After one season as a pitching coach at Sterling College, he moved to Ouachita Baptist where he remained as an assistant for three seasons.  In 2008, he arrived at Campbell as an assistant to Greg Goff, and was elevated to head coach upon Goff's departure after the 2014 season.

Head coaching record
Below is a table of Haire's yearly records as an NCAA baseball coach.

See also
List of current NCAA Division I baseball coaches

References

1980 births
Baseball catchers
Bowling Green Falcons baseball players
Campbell Fighting Camels baseball coaches
Indianapolis Greyhounds baseball players
Living people
Ouachita Baptist Tigers baseball coaches
Sportspeople from Hamilton, Ohio
Sterling Warriors baseball coaches